The 2014–15 Drake Bulldogs men's basketball team represented Drake University during the 2014–15 NCAA Division I men's basketball season. The Bulldogs, led by second year head coach Ray Giacoletti, played their home games at the Knapp Center and were members of the Missouri Valley Conference. They finished the season 9–22, 6–12 in MVC play to finish in seventh place. They lost in the first round of the Missouri Valley tournament to Bradley.

Guard Reed Timmer was named to the conference's all-freshmen team.

Previous season 
The Bulldogs finished the season 15–16, 6–12 in MVC play to finish in a tie for eighth place. They lost in the first round of the Missouri Valley tournament to Evansville.

Departures

Incoming Transfers

Incoming recruits

Class of 2014 recruits

Roster

Schedule

|-
!colspan=9 style="background:#000070; color:#FFFFFF;"| Exhibition

|-
!colspan=9 style="background:#000070; color:#FFFFFF;"| Non-Conference Regular season

|-
!colspan=9 style="background:#000070; color:#FFFFFF;"| Missouri Valley Conference Regular season

|-
!colspan=9 style="background:#000070; color:#FFFFFF;"| Missouri Valley tournament

References

Drake Bulldogs men's basketball seasons
Drake
Drake
Drake